Gwladys Street's Hall of Fame celebrates the men who have contributed to the history of English football club Everton. Everton's ground, Goodison Park, is on Gwladys Street in Walton, Liverpool.

Formation
The Hall of Fame was conceived by David France and inaugurated in 1996. Initial inclusion was decided by a panel of players, journalists, shareholders and season-ticket holders who assessed the accomplishments of the candidates during their careers at Everton. It began with 75 players and five club officials. Additional members have been elected by Everton supporters via annual postal ballots and internet polls.

The Hall of Fame has been celebrated annually at the Britannia Adelphi Hotel in Liverpool. After an 8-year hiatus, the Twelfth Hall of Fame Dinner was held at the Liverpool Hilton in March 2017.

Membership
As of 2009, there are 126 members of the Hall of Fame.

 Walter Abbott (1899/1900 – 1907/08)
 John Bailey
 Alan Ball (1966/67 – 1971/72)
 Billy Balmer (1897/88 – 1907/08)
 Dr James Baxter (Director & Chairman)
 Jack Bell (1892/93 – 1897/98 & 1901/02 – 1902/03)
 Stan Bentham (1933/34 – 1947/48)
 Arthur Berry (1909/10 – 1910/11)
 Billy Bingham (1960/61 – 1962/63)
  Tom Booth (1900/01 – 1907/08)
 Wally Boyes (1937/38 – 1948/49)
 Richard Boyle (1892/93 – 1900/01)
 Paul Bracewell (1984/85 – 1988/89)
 Frank Brettell (1880/81 – 1882/83)
 Cliff Britton (1930/31 – 1938/39)
 Kevin Campbell
 Sir Philip Carter (Director & Chairman)
 Harry Catterick (Manager)
 Edgar Chadwick (1888/89 – 1898/99)
 Rev. Ben Chambers (Founder)
 Sam Chedgzoy (1910/11 – 1925/26)
 Joe Clennell (1913/14 – 1921/22)
 Bobby Collins (1958/59 – 1961/62)
 Billy Cook (1932/33 – 1938/39)
 Harry Cooke (Trainer)
 Jackie Coulter (1933/34 – 1937/38)
 Warney Cresswell (1926/27 – 1935/36)
 Ted Critchley (1926/27 – 1933/34)
 Will Cuff (Director & Chairman)
 Dixie Dean (1924/25 – 1937/38)
 George Dobson (1884/85 – 1888/89)
 John Douglas (1879/80 – 1884/85)
 Jimmy Dunn (1928/29 – 1934/35)
 Tommy Eglington (1946/47 – 1956/57)
 Jack Elliott (Trainer)
 Tom Evans (1880/81 – 1884/85)
 George Farmer (1886/87 – 1889/90)
 Peter Farrell (1946/47 – 1956/57)
 Duncan Ferguson (1994/95 – 1998/99 & 2000/01 – 2005/06)
 Wally Fielding (1945/46 – 1958/59)
 Tom Fleetwood (1910/11 – 1922/23)
 George Fleming (1885/66 – 1888/89)
 Bert Freeman (1907/08 – 1910/11)
 Jimmy Gabriel (1959/60 – 1966/67)
 Fred Geary (1889/90 – 1894/95)
 Charlie Gee (1930/31 – 1938/39)
 Albert Geldard (1932/33 – 1937/38)
 Torry Gillick (1935/36 – 1945/46)
 Andy Gray (1983/84 – 1984/85)
 Andrew Hannah (1888/89 – 1890/91)
 Harold Hardman (1903/04 – 1907/08)
 Brian Harris (1955/56 – 1966/67)
 Val Harris (1907/08 – 1913/14)
 Hunter Hart (1921/22 – 1929/30)
 Colin Harvey (1963/64 – 1974/75)
 Adrian Heath (1981/82 – 1988/89)
 Dave Hickson (1947/48 – 1955/56 & 1957/58 – 1959/60)
 Mike Higgins (1880/81 – 1888/89)
 Johnny Holt (1888/89 – 1897/98)
 Barry Horne (1992/93 – 1995/96)
 John Hurst (1965/66 – 1975/66)
 Jimmy Husband (1964/65 – 1973/74)
 Bobby Irvine (1921/22 – 1927/28)
 Frank Jefferis (1910/11 – 1919/20)
 Tommy Johnson (1929/30 – 1933/34)
 Tommy E. Jones (1950/51 – 1961/62)
 T. G. Jones (1936/37 – 1949/50)
 Tony Kay (1962/63 – 1963/64)
 Howard Kendall (1966/67 – 1981/82 & Manager)
 Bill Kenwright (Director & Chairman)
 Roger Kenyon (1967/68 – 1978/79)
 Andy King (1975/76 – 1979/80 & 1982/83 – 1983/84)
 Brian Labone (1957/58 – 1974/75)
 Bob Latchford (1973/74 – 1980/81)
 Alex Latta (1889/90 – 1895/96)
 Tommy Lawton (1936/37 – 1945/46)
 Mick Lyons (1970/71 – 1981/82)
 George Mahon (Director & Chairman)
 Harry Makepeace (1902/03 – 1914/15)
 Tom Marriot (1880/81 – 1885/86)
 Nigel Martyn
 Jack McGill (1880/81 – 1886/87)
 Duncan McKenzie (1976/77 – 1977/78)
 Joe Mercer (1932/33 – 1946/47)
 Alf Milward (1888/89 – 1896/97)
 Sir John Moores (Director & Chairman)
 Bob Morris (1880/81 – 1885/86)
 Johnny Morrissey (1962/63 – 1971/72)
 Derek Mountfield (1982/83 – 1987/88)
 Alex Parker (1958/59 – 1964/65)
 Bobby Parker (1913/14 – 1920/21)
 John Willie Parker (1950/51 – 1955/56)
 Fred Pickering (1963/64 – 1966/67)
 Kevin Ratcliffe (1979/80 – 1991/92)
 Peter Reid (1982/83 – 1988/89)
 Jas Richards (1880/81 – 1884/85)
 Kevin Richardson (1981/82 – 1986/87)
 Joe Royle (1965/66 – 1974/75)
 Ted Sagar (1929/30 – 1952/53)
 Alex Scott (1962/63 – 1966/67)
 Billy Scott (1904/05 – 1911/12)
 Jimmy Settle (1898/99 – 1907/08)
 Graeme Sharp (1979/80 – 1990/91)
 Jack Sharp (1899/1900 – 1909/10)
 Kevin Sheedy (1982/83 – 1991/92)
 Ian Snodin
 Neville Southall (1981/82 – 1997/98)
 Jack Southworth (1893/94 – 1894/95)
 Jimmy Stein (1928/29 – 1934/35)
 Trevor Steven (1983/84 – 1988/89)
 Gary Stevens (1981/82 – 1987/88)
 Alex Stevenson (1933/34 – 1948/49)
 Graham Stuart (1993/94 – 1997/98)
 Jack Taylor (1896/97 – 1909/10)
 Derek Temple (1956/57 – 1967/68)
 Jock Thomson (1929/30 – 1938/39)
 Alec Troup (1922/23 – 1929/30)
 David Unsworth (1991/92 – 1997/98 & 1998/99 – 2003/04)
 Pat van den Hauwe
 Roy Vernon (1959/60 – 1964/65)
 Alfred Wade (1878/79 – 1879/80)
 Dave Watson (1986/87 – 1998/99)
 Gordon Watson (1936/37 – 1948/49)
 Gordon West (1961/62 – 1972/73)
 Tommy White (1927/28 – 1936/37)
 Alan Whittle (1967/68 – 1972/73)
 Ray Wilson (1964/65 – 1968/69)
 Samuel Wolstenholme (1897/98 – 1903/04)
 Tommy Wright (1964/65 – 1972/73)
 Alex Young (1960/61 – 1967/68)
 Sandy Young (1901/02 – 1910/11)

Images and biographies of these men are included in the three books associated with the Hall of Fame and a video produced for the 2009 celebrations. The Hall of Fame has been celebrated annually at the Adelphi Hotel in Liverpool. These events have provided opportunities for fans to interact with their heroes.

Sources
Gwladys Street's Hall of Fame 
Gwladys Street's Hall of Fame 2nd edition 
Gwladys Street's Hall of Fame 3rd edition

Notes

References

External links
Evertonhalloffame.com

Everton F.C.
Association football museums and halls of fame
Halls of fame in England
Awards established in 1996
1996 establishments in England
History of Liverpool
Lists of association football players by club in England
Association football player non-biographical articles